Der Kampf is a 1936 Soviet-German film directed by Gustav von Wangenheim.

Plot 
In Germany, Hans Lemke is murdered after learning about secret military production at the perfume factory in his city. His brother Fritz wants to expose the murderers of Hans.

Starring 
 Lotte Loebinger as Fritz Lemkes mother
 Bruno Schmidtsdorf as Fritz Lemke
 Gregor Gog as Peters
 Ingeborg Franke as Anna
 Heinrich Greif as Eickhoff
 Aleksandr Timontayev as Rabenkampf
 Robert Trösch as Otto
 Alexander Granach as Rovelli
 Aleksandr Geirot as Klebersbusch
 Evgenia Mezentseva as Woman

References

External links 

1936 films
1930s Russian-language films
1930s German-language films
Films about Nazi Germany
Films directed by Gustav von Wangenheim
Soviet drama films
1936 drama films
Soviet black-and-white films
German black-and-white films
German drama films
1936 multilingual films
Soviet multilingual films
German multilingual films
1930s German films